Colegio Cristóbal Colón ("Christopher Columbus School") is a private school in Colonia El Roble, San Salvador, El Salvador. It serves age 3 through bachillerato (senior high school).

References

External links
 Colegio Cristóbal Colón 

Schools in El Salvador
Buildings and structures in San Salvador